Sir Simonds d'Ewes, 1st Baronet (18 December 1602 – 18 April 1650) was an English antiquary and politician. He was bred for the bar, was a member of the Long Parliament and left notes on its transactions. D'Ewes took the Puritan side in the Civil War. His Journal of all the Parliaments of Elizabeth is of value; he left an Autobiography and Correspondence.

Early life
Simonds d'Ewes was born on 18 December 1602 in Milden, Suffolk, the eldest son of Paul d'Ewes, one of the Six Clerks in Chancery, and his first wife Cecelia, daughter and heiress of Sir Richard Simonds of Coxden, Dorsetshire. His father's family came originally from Gelderland: Simonds' great-grandfather emigrated to England about 1510. He inherited a fortune from his maternal grandfather while still young; his other grandfather, Gerard d'Ewes, of Gaynes, Upminster, Essex, who married Grace Hynde, was a printer. 

After his mother's death in 1618, his father remarried the widowed Elizabeth Isham, Lady Denton, who was only a few years older than her stepson: Simonds approved of the marriage and may have played a part in arranging it. His relations with his father, a difficult and quarrelsome man, were never good. After some early private teaching, including time at the school of Henry Reynolds (father of Bathsua Makin, who impressed d'Ewes much more), he was sent to the grammar school at Bury St Edmunds. At Bury St Edmunds, he wrote 2,850 verses of poetry in Greek and Latin. 

D'Ewes then went to St John's College, Cambridge, and studied under Richard Holdsworth. At St John's, he was exposed to and influenced by a strong college tradition of Puritanism.

He was admitted to the Middle Temple in 1611, and in 1623 was called to the Bar. Being independently wealthy, he did not pursue a legal career, preferring instead to follow up antiquarian interests, which took him to the records in the Tower of London. He met Sir Robert Cotton, who introduced him to John Selden, the outstanding lawyer-scholar of the time; but D'Ewes found him conceited.

In 1626, he married Anne Clopton, daughter and heiress of Sir William Clopton, of Luton's Hall (also known as Kentwell Hall) near Long Melford, Suffolk. The marriage brought him a considerable addition to his wealth, but was evidently a love match, judging by his letters to Anne, who was just fourteen. They had one son, who died an infant in 1636, and one daughter Cicely, who married Sir Thomas D'Arcy, 1st Baronet. He was  knighted by Charles I on 6 December 1626. 

He took a house at Islington, where he pursued his studies. In 1632 he retired to Bury St. Edmunds, in belated obedience to the King's proclamation to the gentry to quit London and live at home. His father, who died in 1631, had purchased Stowlangtoft Hall nearby, and Simonds took up residence there in 1633.

Political career
In 1639, d'Ewes was High Sheriff of Suffolk, and in 1640, he was elected as member for Sudbury, sitting in the Long Parliament. Although he opposed the King's arbitrary rule, his views were moderate; he was given a baronetcy by the king in 1641, possibly as an attempt to buy allegiance, in July. Since his beloved younger brother was an officer in the King's army, this is plausible. But it cannot be confirmed because the King's desperate need for money had led to a resumption of the sale of honours such as baronetcies at this time. Simonds' pleasure in the honour was destroyed almost at once by the death of his beloved first wife Anne.

On the outbreak of the First English Civil War in 1642, d'Ewes joined the Parliamentarians. He remained in Parliament until 1648, when he was expelled in Pride's Purge. After 1648, d'Ewes took no further part in politics, and devoted himself to literary studies. He died on 18 April 1650, having married again, to Elizabeth Willoughby, daughter of Sir Henry Willoughby, 1st Baronet of Risley, Derbyshire and his first wife Elizabeth Knollys, daughter of  Sir Henry Knollys. By Elizabeth, he had his second and only surviving son and heir, Willoughby, who succeeded as second baronet.

Antiquarian
Simonds d'Ewes is perhaps best known for his work as an antiquarian, and particularly for his transcriptions of important historical documents, originals of which do not survive today, and the Journals of all the Parliaments during the Reign of Queen Elizabeth. Although d'Ewes was ambitious in this field, he lacked the ability to generalise or construct effectively, and died without publishing any major work, except The Primitive Practice for Preserving Truth (1645) and a few speeches. The Journals were published posthumously in 1682 by his nephew, the lawyer and antiquary Paul Bowes.

Legacy
Simonds d'Ewes, although known for the events in parliament during the 1640s, is best known for his contribution to the antiquarian world. His chief scholarly legacy is the collection of his transcriptions of primary documents that are now lost. He also kept a diary, which gives an insight into the events in Parliament, as well as glimpses of his own character. 

Although he supported Parliament against the King during the Civil War, he was frequently shocked by the unruly and aggressive behaviour of his fellow Parliamentarians. Of the events leading to the abrupt dissolution of Parliament in March 1629, he wrote that "diverse fiery spirits in the House of Commons were very faulty and cannot be excused".

See also
Long Parliament
Thomas Pride
Pride's Purge
Puritan

References

Bibliography

 and vol. 2

External links

1602 births
1650 deaths
Baronets in the Baronetage of England
Alumni of St John's College, Cambridge
English antiquarians
People from Babergh District
High Sheriffs of Suffolk
17th-century English writers
17th-century English male writers
17th-century antiquarians
English MPs 1640–1648